Treforgan (Welsh: "Morgan's place") is a small village in the  community of Llangoedmor, Ceredigion, Wales, which is 74.7 miles (120.2 km) from Cardiff and 196.3 miles (315.8 km) from London. Treforgan is represented in the  Senedd by Elin Jones (Plaid Cymru) and is part of the Ceredigion constituency in the House of Commons.

Treforgan is also the name of a Grade II* listed country house within the community.

References

See also
List of localities in Wales by population

Villages in Ceredigion